The 1904–05 Princeton Tigers men's ice hockey season was the 6th season of play for the program.

Season
The Tigers played a program low of six games during the season and were only able to win one game against lowly Brown. The team would not play so few or win so few games until the season after World War I. Princeton played all of its games at the St. Nicholas Rink.

Roster

Standings

Schedule and Results

|-
!colspan=12 style=";" | Regular Season

References

Princeton Tigers men's ice hockey seasons
Princeton
Princeton
Princeton
Princeton